Wildboyz is an American spin-off television series and follow-up to Jackass, which debuted in 2003 on MTV for the first two seasons. The show then moved to sister channel MTV2 for the final two seasons. The series follows Steve-O and Chris Pontius who travel parts of the world where they perform their stunts in exotic environments while educating their audience on wildlife and local culture. Throughout the series, a total of 32 episodes have aired.

Series overview

Episodes

Season 1 (2003)

Season 2 (2004)

Season 3 (2005)

Season 4 (2006)

Special

References

External links
 
 

Wildboyz episodes